Athletic Club Ajaccio, commonly referred to as AC Ajaccio, ACA or simply Ajaccio, is a French association football club based in the city of Ajaccio on the island of Corsica. The club was founded in 1910 and plays in Ligue 1. The club president is Christian Leca, and the first-team is coached by manager Olivier Pantaloni, following the sacking of Christian Bracconi in October 2014. Ajaccio play their home matches at the Stade François Coty and are rivals with fellow Corsican club Bastia, with whom they contest the Corsica derby (Derby Corse).

Historical information 
Depending on sources, it is agreed that Ajaccio began playing in 1909–10. Their adopted colors are red and white stripes. Though they used to play in what was previously utilised as a sand dump, they decided to move to another, cleaner, safer stadium upon the insistence of Jean Lluis, father-in-law of club president Louis Baretti. The new stadium that was chosen held 5,000 spectators and was in use until 1969.

AC Ajaccio were elected Corsican champions on eight occasions, in 1920, 1921, 1934, 1939, 1948, 1950, 1955 and 1964, and are one of three big "island" teams, along with Gazélec Ajaccio and Bastia, the competition between the three being kept no secret. Spectators during the 1946 Corsican Cup final, held between A.C.A. and Sporting Bastia, were handed umbrellas to shield themselves from the violence. Upon refusal of a penalty which would have been awarded to ACA, violence erupted between the fans, who used umbrellas both to cause and shield themselves from violence. This final was abandoned and replayed much later.

A.C.A. became a professional team in 1965 thanks to the ambitious efforts of the club's leaders. They initially adopted the symbol of the polar bear, but this has since been dropped in favour of a more stylised logo that uses a part of the Corsican flag.

In 1967, the team became the first Corsican club to play in France's top division. Prior to the 2022-2023 season, they were most recently in Ligue 1 in the 2013–14 season, when they were relegated after finishing in last place, following a spell of three seasons in the top flight; the drop was confirmed with defeat at neighbours Bastia.

In November 2014, Olivier Pantaloni returned for a third spell as manager. His team came third in 2017–18, qualifying for the play-offs, where they beat Le Havre in a semi-final marred by violence on and off the pitch, before losing the final to Toulouse. The club were denied promotion in 2019–20 when the season was curtailed with ten games remaining due to the coronavirus pandemic; Ajaccio were one point off the top two, who were the only ones to go up as the play-offs could not be contested.
In the 2021-2022 Ligue 2 season, Ajaccio were promoted back to Ligue 1 after finishing second.

Players

Current squad

Out on loan

Notable past players 
For a complete list of AC Ajaccio players, see :Category:AC Ajaccio players.

Reserve squad 
As of 11 February 2023.

Club officials

Coaches

Honours 
Division 2 (Second Division)
Champions (2): 1966–67, 2001–02
Championnat National (Third Division)
Champions (1): 1997–98
Ligue de Corse (Corsican League)
Champions (9): 1920, 1921, 1934, 1939, 1948, 1950, 1955, 1964, 1994

References

External links 

AC Ajaccio at Soccerway

 
Association football clubs established in 1910
AC Ajaccio
AC Ajaccio
Football clubs in Corsica
Football clubs in France
Sport in Corse-du-Sud
Ligue 1 clubs